Pareuptychia metaleuca, the one-banded satyr, is a species of butterfly of the family Nymphalidae. It is found from Mexico to Brazil.

Subspecies
Pareuptychia metaleuca metaleuca (Mexico, Guatemala, Costa Rica)
Pareuptychia metaleuca tekolokem Brévignon, 2005 (French Guiana)

References

Butterflies described in 1870
Euptychiina
Arthropods of South America
Fauna of French Guiana
Fauna of Brazil
Nymphalidae of South America
Butterflies of North America
Taxa named by Jean Baptiste Boisduval